Everyman's Welfare Service (also simply called Everyman's and formerly known as Campaigners for Christ, Campaigners, or C4C) is a parachurch organization that was founded in 1936 in Melbourne, Victoria, Australia. It provides opportunities for recreation to members of the military, operating recreation centres on most Australian Defence Force bases. It is affiliated with the National Young Life Campaign of England. As Campaigners for Christ, the organization engaged in open-air preaching and ran a centre in Port Moresby, Papua New Guinea. C4C owned a room in a building opposite Adelaide railway station in which they engaged in evangelism. Athol Richardson served as the C4C president during World War II. Evangelist Frank Jenner partnered with C4C, although he was not officially part of the organization. Eventually, the organization was renamed "Everyman's Welfare Service" in reference to Colossians 1:28.

References

Christian organisations based in Australia
Charities based in Australia
Australian Defence Force
Outdoor recreation organizations
Evangelical parachurch organizations
Evangelical organizations established in the 20th century
Social welfare parachurch organizations
1936 establishments in Australia
Christian organizations established in 1936
Evangelicalism in Australia
Military-related organizations
Medical and health organisations based in Victoria (Australia)
Foreign charities operating in Papua New Guinea